The 2020–21 was FC Basel's 127th season in existence and the club's 26th consecutive season in the top flight of Swiss football since their promotion in the 1993–94 season. The 2020–21 Swiss Super League season started on the weekend 19–20 September 2020 and ended on 21 May 2021. In addition to the Swiss Super League, Basel also participated in this season's Swiss Cup and the UEFA Europa League.

Club

FC Basel Holding AG
The FC Basel Holding AG (Holding) owns 75% of the club FC Basel (FC Basel 1893 AG) and the other 25% is owned by the club itself. As of the 2020 AGM in June, Bernhard Burgener owned about 82% of the shares in the Holding, David Degen owned 10% and about 8% was held by four small investors. At the FC Basel Holding AG AGM Marco Streller stood down from the board of directors. Bernhard Burgener, as chairman of the Holding, Roland Heri, as CEO of the club, Peter von Büren, as financial director and Karl Odermatt, as advisor, remained on the board of the Holding.

During the winter months, rumors were put into circulation that Burgener wanted to sell his shares in the Holding to a firm called Centricus, a London-based global investment firm. This caused diverse fan protests. Come the beginning of May, Burgener said he would sell his shares to a letterbox company called Basel Dream and Vision AG. The ferocity of the fan protests increased. Degen announced that he had a pre-sale right and to protect his rights Degen went the legal way. On 29 March the Holding announced that the board of directors of FC Basel Holding AG was restricted in its ability to act due to a super-provisional ruling caused by David Degen's action. Following numerous private discusions on this subject, on 11 May the Holding made the announcement that Bernhard Burgener and David Degen have come to an out-of-court settlement, in the best interests of FC Basel 1893, on the ownership structure of the Holding. David Degen took over all shares from Bernhard Burgener. With this result, the protests stopped and everything calmed down. The change of the board was terminated for 15 June 2021.

Club management 
The club's 126th AGM was due to take place on 9 November 2020. But because of the situation in took place in written form during the week from 6 November to 13 November 2020. The board of directors up until this date under the holding owner Bernhard Burgener were: Burgener himself as president, CEO Roland Heri, financial manager Peter von Büren, as well as Marco Streller, Reto Baumgartner, Dominik Donzé and Benno Kaiser. Ruedi Zbinden had been sport director the previous year, but resigned on 18 August and returned to his previous job as chef scout.

At the AGM the Bernhard Burgener as club chairman, Peter von Büren as finance director, and Streller stood down and vacated their positions. The directors Baumgartner, Donzé and Kaiser declared their willingness to continue. Eight further members of the club also declared themselves as candidates. There were 2589 votes with valid rights, the absolute majority was 1295. Baumgartner received 2382 votes, Donzé 1913 and Kaiser 1892 and these three were voted back onto the board. The other eight they failed to reach an absolute majority. For the position as club president Baumgartner received 2326 votes. Therefore, from 18 November the club's board is as follows:

Team management 
On 26 August the club announced that Ciriaco Sforza had been hired as the first team manager as of 1 September 2020. He had previously been head coach of FC Wil and he brought his assistant Daniel Hasler with him. Massimo Colomba stayed with the club as Goalkeeper Coach. On 21 September the club announced that they had hired Patrick Rahmen as second assistant trainer.

Youth coach Alex Frei had previously been trainer of the U-18 team and moved up to the U-21, but due to differences with the club directors he quit his job on 24 August. On 1 September the club announced that Matthias Kohler was hired as the new U-21 team trainer.

On 6 April 2021 the club announced that, due to the lack of sporting success, FC Basel 1893 were separating themselves from head coach Ciriaco Sforza with immediate effect. They also announced that they had separated themselves from Assistant manager Daniel Hasler at the same time. Until the end of the season, the first team would be looked after by the other previous assistant Patrick Rahmen, on an interim basis, as head coach. In the communique on the following day it was announced that Ognjen Zaric was appointed as assistant manager. Zaric had been coach of the Basel 1893 U-18 team since summer 2020 and before that he had been head coach of TSV 1860 Rosenheim in the Regionalliga Bayern, the fourth tier of German football.

Overview

Off and pre-season
There were a number of changes in the squad during the summer break. Zdravko Kuzmanović, and Kevin Bua left the club because their contracts were not renewed. Edon Zhegrova, Emil Bergström and Eric Ramires also left the club and this because their loan periods had ended. Then on 12 August the club announced that Jonas Omlin was transferred out to Montpellier. After the season had started and the club failed to qualify for the group stage of the 2020–21 UEFA Europa League, the club made three announcements on 5 October, first that Blás Riveros had transferred to Brøndby, then that Kemal Ademi had moved on to Fenerbahçe and finally that Omar Alderete had been transferred to Hertha BSC.

In the other direction, the players Konstantinos Dimitriou, Julian Von Moos, Aldo Kalulu and Dimitri Oberlin were back in the Basel squad after being out on loan for the previous season. Arthur Cabral, who had been on loan from Palmeiras, was signed in on a perminat basis on a three-year contract. The contract with Ricky van Wolfswinkel had run out, but he signed in for another two years until the end of the 2021–22 season. On 11 September FCB announced that they had prolonged the contract with Taulant Xhaka until summer 2024. Then it was announced on 15 September that they had also prolonged the contract with captain Valentin Stocker.

Further, on 8 August the former Austria national team goalkeeper Heinz Lindner was signed in from Wehen Wiesbaden, with a three-year contract dated up until summer 2023. Then on 11 September Italian full-back Andrea Padula was signed in from FC Wil, where he had played the last half year under manager Ciriaco Sforza, also on a three-year contract. Somewhat surprising came the announcement on 19 September that Juventus had bought U-18 right back defender Albian Hajdari, but he stayed with the squad, being loaned back to Basel for two seasons.

The 2020–21 Swiss Super League started on 20 September, but then on 22 September the club announced that the Kosovar international Edon Zhegrova (whose loan from Genk had actually ended at the end of June) had also signed in new on a three-year contract. On 2 October it was announced that Jorge Marco de Oliveira Moraes, simply known as Jorge, had signed in on a loan contract from Monaco. On 7 October the club then announced that Swiss international player Timm Klose had been signed in on loan from Norwich City. Klose had played for the club as youth international, but had moved onto FC Thun in the 2011–12 Swiss Super League season to start his professional football career. Finally, only hours before the transfer-period closed, the club announced that Pajtim Kasami had signed in on a two-year contract. Kasami had previously played for Sion, but FC Sion's president Christian Constantin had terminated his contract with them, without notice, after he had failed to agree to an 80% salary pay cut during coronavirus pandemic. The transfer-period in Switzerland closed on 12 October at mid-night.

In total 12 players had left the club and 12 players had signed in.

Winter break transfer window
On the 5 December 2020 Basel announced that they had terminated the contract with Dimitri Oberlin, without stating the reason, but according to the media it had something to do with a non-corona-conform party. On 14 January the club then announced that they had loaned Tician Tushi out to FC Wil until the end of the season, so that he could gain more playing experience. His trainer in Wil would be Alex Frei who was his coach as he played with the Basel U-18 youth team. Basel's fourth goalkeeper Jozef Pukaj was loaned to Stade Lausanne Ouchy until 30 June 2021. On 27 January Basel announced that they had transferred Konstantinos Dimitriou to Mezőkövesdi SE. On the same day it was made public that Amir Abrashi had signed in on loan from Freiburg. On 30 January Gonçalo Cardoso also signed in on loan from West Ham. On 1 February the club announced that Samuele Campo had been loaned out to SV Darmstadt 98.

Second Half of Season
On 6 April 2021, Ciriaco Sforza was sacked "due to the recent poor results". Patrick Rahmen, the former assistant manager, took over as interim manager. Of FC Basel's recent nine games as of the sack, they only won a single match, drawing three, and losing four. The final blow came as Basel lost 1–2 against FC Vaduz, who were the bottom-placed team in the league at the time. After the change in management, results immediately improved. The won five of their next eight games, drawing twice, and only losing to the designated champions BSC Young Boys. On 11 May 2021 the FC Basel Holding AG chairman Bernhard Burgener and board member David Degen announced a transfer of ownership rights after months of massiv fan protests. The new owner David Degen announced his intention of making Patrick Rahmen the head coach for the coming season in recognition of his good work with the first team. Furthermore, Degen announced a complete restructuring of the shareholding structures and a new board, which includes former FC Basel manager Christian Gross.

The Campaign

Domestic League
First half of season
The season started on the weekend of 19/20 September 2020. Basel's priority aim for the new season was to see if they could play for the league championship. On Monday 31 August 2020 the Swiss Football League (SFL) published the match schedule for the 2020–21 Swiss Super League. In a first step, the SFL published the schedule for the first 18 rounds, but only fixed times for the first nine rounds. The final schedule with all games for all 36 rounds will follow by the end of the year. FCB started into the new season on Sunday 20 September with the home game against newly promoted FC Vaduz in St. Jakob-Park. This ended with a disappointing 2–2 draw, Vaduz were twice able to equalise a Basel lead. In the next round Basel suffered a defeat against Servette before they achieved their first two victories against Luzern and St. Gallen. The team then suffered three defeats before they could record three successive victories. It was a continuous up and down, not just for Basel but for all teams, apart from Young Boys who opened a gap at the top of the table. At the end of the first half of the season Basel had taken in the second position in the table.

Second half of season
To the start of the second half of the season it was still a continuous up and down, again not just for Basel but for all teams, each team was winning one match and losing the next. No team was playing constant, except Young Boys who pulled away at the top of the table. Things turned worse for Basel. Three draws, five defeats and one single victory, as well as the out in the cup. The final blow came as Basel lost 1–2 against Vaduz, who were the bottom-placed team in the league at the time. Head coach Ciriaco Sforza was sacked the next day. Until the end of the season, the first team would be looked after by the other previous assistant Patrick Rahmen, on an interim basis. After the change in the team management, results immediately improved. The team won five of their next eight games, drawing twice, and only losing to the designated champions BSC Young Boys. The season can be described as disappointing, the season's aim was missed, the minimal aim was reached. But second place with a 31-point gap behind the new champions could not be described as good. The qualification to the newly created Europa Conference League second qualifying round was achieved.

Conclusion
BSC Young Boys won the championship and with 24 victories, nine draws and only two defeats. They obtained 81 points and as champions qualified for the 2021–22 Champions League second qualifying round. Basel, with 15 victories, eight draws and twelve defeats were second placed and together with third placed Servette, 14 victories, eight draws 13 defeats, qualified for the Europa Conference League second qualifying round. Sion, in the last game of the season, managed to climb from last position to second last and thus saved themselves from direct relegation and advanced to the promotion/relegation play-off. However, Vaduz slipped to bottom position and were relegated to next season's Challenge League, which is the second tier of Swiss football.

Domestic Cup
Basel's clear aim for the cup is to win the title. The first round of the this season's Swiss Cup was played on the week-end 28 to 30 August and the second round was played on the week-end 11 to 13 September 2020. The four teams engaged in UEFA competitions received a bye in both these rounds and, therefore, Basel entered into the competition in the third round. Basel were drawn to play away against Winterthur from the Challenge League, the second tier of Swiss football, on 9 February 2021. Due to pitch conditions in the Stadion Schützenwiese in Winterthur the venue and date were changed and the match took place in the St. Jakob-Park on 17 February 2021 and it resulted in a debacle.

With a 2–6 defeat against Winterthur, FC Basel 1893 were knocked brutally out of the cup competition. In the first half nothing went for FCB. Red-blue certainly had tp accept the reproach they defended too passively before the first goal and achieved very little going forwards. The outsiders went into an early lead and added a second just before half time. After the mediocre first half, in which the FCB also lacked the necessary competition luck, Rotblau missed the start of second half completely. Directly after the break FCW forwards played as they wished with the FCB defence and added three more goals within 10 minutes. Samir Ramizi twice, Roman Buess, Roberto Alves and Gezim Pepsi had scored to put FCW well in front before FCB could send out a small sign of life in the closing stages, with goals from Pajtim Kasami and Gonçalo Cardoso. The final point was another Winterthur goal from Anas Mahamid in the 86th minute.

Basel had missed their season's aim and that with a debacle. With the end score at 2–6 this also meant that this became the highest number of goals that the team had conceded in their home stadium since it was opened on 15 March 2001. The biggest defeats to this date were Manchester City 0–4 in the 2017–18 UEFA Champions League, Arsenal 1–4 in the 2016–17 UEFA Champions League and Barcelona 0–5 in the 2008–09 UEFA Champions League.

Europa League
Basel were qualified for the UEFA Europa League and started in the qualifying phase second qualifying round. The club's aim in this competition was to reach the group stage. The draw for the second qualifying round was held on 31 August 2020 and Basel were drawn with an away game against Osijek of Croatia.

Osijek
The match against Osijek was played on 17 September in their home stadium Stadion Gradski vrt and Basel won the game with 2–1. Arthur Cabral put the visitors one up after 18 minutes, the assist coming from Valentin Stocker. Stocker himself pu them two up shortly before half time, the assist coming from Afimico Pululu. Basel controlled the game the entire time, but Ante Majstorović pulled one back six minutes from time.

Anorthosis Famagusta
In the third qualifying round, to be played one week later on 24 September at home in the St. Jakob-Park and Basel were drawn against Anorthosis Famagusta. This game was won 3–2. Basel took control of the game from the very start, but Valentin Stocker's shot in the first minute was blocked. Three minutes later Silvan Widmer scored to put the home team one up. Samuele Campo added the second after 12 minutes and an own goal from Hovhannes Hambardzumyan put Basel three up after 21 minutes. Basel lost their thred shortly before half time and Branko Vrgoč pulled one back. In the second period Basel were no longer dominant. Despite the fact that Tornike Okriashvili received the second yellow card and was sent off, Anorthosis found their way back into the game. Anorthosis were awarded a penalty in the after 67 minutes and Kvilitaia scored from the spot. Basel hung on to the lead despite the fact that Von Moos was sent off for receiving a second yellow card.

CSKA Sofia
In the play-off round Basel were drawn at home against CSKA Sofia on 1 October 2020. Basel played a good first half and had six or seven good chances, while CSKA only had two. Despite taking the lead after 54 minutes through a Penalty spot goal from Arthur Cabral, Basel's performance got worse and CSKA were able to get into the game. Substitute Tiago Rodrigues scored the equaliser 13 minutes after coming on just 18 minutes from time. CSKA pushed forward on Basel, who seemed to tire under the pressure. Two minutes from time, as it seemed the match would go in extra time Rodrigues added his second and Basel fell apart. The added time was six minutes and with the last shot of the game Ahmed Ahmedov netted a third for the visitors. Basel lost 1–3 after full-time and failed to qualify for the group stage and therefore missed their European aim.

Players

First-team squad 
The following is the list of the Basel first team squad. It also includes players that were in the squad the day the season started on 19 September 2020, but subsequently left the club after that date.

Transfers summer 2020

In

Out

Transfers winter break

In

Out

Results and fixtures

Legend

Friendly matches

Pre- and mid-season

Winter break

Competitions

Overview

Swiss Super League

Results summary

Results by round

First half of season 
On Monday 31 August 2020 the Swiss Football League (SFL) published the schedule for the Raiffeisen Super League 2020–21. In a first step, the SFL published the schedule for the first 18 rounds, but only fixed times for the first nine rounds. The final schedule with all games for all 36 rounds followed at the end of the year.

Second half of season

Final league table

Swiss Cup 

The draw for the first round was held in August 2020. The Super League and Challenge League clubs were seeded and could not be drawn against each other. The lower division teams were granted home advantage three rounds. All teams in the Super League were granted a bye in the first round and all teams engaged in UEFA competitions received a bye in the second round as well. Therefore, Basel enter the competition in the third round.

UEFA Europa League

See also
 History of FC Basel
 List of FC Basel players
 List of FC Basel seasons

References

Sources
 FCB squad 2020–21 at fcb-archiv.ch
 Switzerland 2020–21 at RSSSF

External links

 Homepage Verein "Basler Fussballarchiv" 

FC Basel seasons
Basel
Basel